In Greek mythology, Lysithea ( or ; Ancient Greek: Λυσιθέα) or Lysithoe may refer to the following women:

 Lysithea, a daughter of Evenus and mother of Helenus by Zeus. She may be the same or distinct with the below figure.
Lysithoe, an Oceanid, as the daughter of the Titans Oceanus and his sister-consort Tethys. She was also one of Zeus' many lovers and by him the mother of Heracles. When Lysithea became pregnant by Zeus, she wanted to keep her pregnancy a secret from him. So she asked a plant, an animal and a stone to help her. The plant and animal refused to help her, but the stone shut her up until she gave birth. During this time Lysithea wept tears over her lot, which she then gave to the stone and which led to the formation of the rock crystal.
 Lysithea, another name of Semele, daughter of King Cadmus of Thebes and mother of Dionysus.

Notes

References 

 Marcus Tullius Cicero, Nature of the Gods from the Treatises of M.T. Cicero translated by Charles Duke Yonge (1812-1891), Bohn edition of 1878. Online version at the Topos Text Project.
Marcus Tullius Cicero, De Natura Deorum. O. Plasberg. Leipzig. Teubner. 1917.  Latin text available at the Perseus Digital Library.
Pseudo-Clement, Recognitions from Ante-Nicene Library Volume 8, translated by Smith, Rev. Thomas. T. & T. Clark, Edinburgh. 1867. Online version at theio.com

Oceanids
Divine women of Zeus
Women in Greek mythology